Li Tong may refer to:

Li Tong (Ciyuan) (李通), courtesy name Ciyuan (次元), Han dynasty general
Li Tong (Wenda) (李通), courtesy name Wenda (文達), Han dynasty general
Li Tong (Tang dynasty) (李通), Tang dynasty prince, 18th son of Emperor Daizong of Tang
Li Tong (Jin dynasty) (李通), Jin dynasty official
Li Tong (canoeist) (李彤), Chinese slalom canoeist
Li Tong (hurdler) (李彤), Chinese hurdler
Li Tong (musician) (李彤), Chinese guitarist, founding member of Black Panther

See also
Tong Li (disambiguation)